Klaus Huber (born 1943) is a Swiss former footballer who played in the 1960s. He played as forward.

Huber played for SpVgg Rheinfelden and joined FC Basel's first team for their 1963–64 FC Basel season und team manager Jiří Sobotka. Huber played his domestic league debut for the club in the home game at the Landhof on 1 December 1963 as Basel won three goal to nil against Luzern due to the hat-trick from Karl Odermatt.

In his one season for the club, Huber played a total of six games for Basel without scoring a goals Four of these games were in the Nationalliga A and two were friendly games.

References

Sources
 Die ersten 125 Jahre. Publisher: Josef Zindel im Friedrich Reinhardt Verlag, Basel. 
 Verein "Basler Fussballarchiv" Homepage
(NB: Despite all efforts, the editors of these books and the authors in "Basler Fussballarchiv" have failed to be able to identify all the players, their date and place of birth or date and place of death, who played in the games during the early years of FC Basel)

FC Basel players
Swiss men's footballers
Association football forwards
1943 births
Living people